The  was a monorail in Inuyama, Aichi that connected the Japan Monkey Park to Inuyama-yūen Station, operated by Nagoya Railroad (Meitetsu). The line featured steep sections, including one 9.7% grade, and traveled through an artificial canyon for a section. The trip took about four minutes.

History
The Monkey Park Monorail Line opened on 21 March 1962, and was the first Hitachi Monorail using the ALWEG track standard.

The line closed on 27 December 2008 following Meitetsu's decision based on its small ridership and aging facilities. In 2006, ridership averaged only 645 passengers per day.

Trains
The line had two trains with three cars each, which could be coupled together for higher capacity. The trains operated on a 1,500 V DC power supply, and had a top speed of 35 km/h.

Two monorail cars, end car 101 and intermediate car 201, are scheduled to be preserved next to the former Dōbutsuen Station in their original livery of silver with red and white bodyside stripes from 19 March 2009. Additionally, a single car from the defunct line is currently on display at the Spa Resort Yunohana. Visitors can tour the inside and outside of the monorail car, which briefly became a location for a Japanese geocaching adventure game in Kani-city.

The Meitetsu train is also featured in a Japanese train simulation video game, Densha de Go! Nagoya Railroad, along with the other Meitetsu trains.

Stations
Dōbutsuen Station (Japan Monkey Park)
Naritasan Station
Inuyama-yūen Station

See also
Monorails in Japan

References

Monorails in Japan
Rail transport in Aichi Prefecture
Lines of Nagoya Railroad
Alweg people movers
Railway lines opened in 1962
Railway lines closed in 2008
Defunct monorails

External links
 YouTube video taken in 2005